Shake, Rattle and Roll 8 is a 2006 Filipino horror anthology film directed by Rahyan Q. Carlos, Topel Lee, and Michael Tuviera, and the eighth installment of the Shake, Rattle & Roll film series. It is produced by Regal Entertainment, and was an entry to the 2006 Metro Manila Film Festival.

The ninth installment, Shake, Rattle and Roll 9, was released in 2007.

Plot

"13th Floor"
On October 14, 1986, a fire triggered by a burning paper airplane destroys an orphanage, killing many of the orphans including their matron Jene. Twenty years later, a high-rise apartment building stands on the site of the orphanage. In one of the apartment's penthouse suites resides Alex (Krystal Reyes) and her parents, Diana and Oscar (Isay Alvarez and Robert Seña).

For Alex's birthday, which happens to fall on the 20th anniversary of the orphanage fire, Diana and Oscar plan to throw a party and hires a group of party organizers. Upon arrival, the group led by Sonny (Bearwin Meily) consists of head caterer and chef Marge (Keanna Reeves), the assistants Gino (Joseph Bitangcol) and Alyson (Roxanne Guinoo) and the magician/clown Jun (Janus Del Prado), examines the building and begins to feel the presence of lost souls, which was first felt during their elevator ride.

Upon stepping at Alex's suite, the group again experiences strange phenomena but dismisses them to set up for the party. After inviting some children with their matron, they begin Alex's birthday party. Unknown to any of them, the children and the matron they invited were the souls of the orphans and their matron who died in the aforementioned fire.

The presence of the souls disrupted the party into chaos. The spirits manifested themselves altogether and the original 14th floor where the party was held was changed to 13. After the chase, the lost souls reappeared in the form of the orphans and Jene. Jene reveals the truth to the family and the party organizers: Alex herself has a connection to them as she was born on October 14, 1995, the ninth anniversary of the incident. Jen also reveals that two of the party organizers, Sonny and Jun, are both the only survivors and the reason why the orphanage was burned. Eventually, the souls forgive the organizers and depart for the afterlife.

"Yaya"
Mischievous child prankster Benjo (Nash Aguas) sends many nannies packing and resigning. When his mother Grace (Sheryl Cruz) hires a new nanny named Cecil (Iza Calzado), Benjo promises to stop his mean pranks. Although things seemed normal at first, Benjo becomes suspicious about Cecil; evidenced was shown when the family's pet dog dog Toby barks mad at her on her arrival. Grace insisted for Benjo to calm down.

During Cecil's tenure, Benjo's suspicions arise and he becomes more watchful and alert. At school, a determined Benjo sought help from his teacher Mel (TJ Trinidad), telling him everything about Cecil's demonic nature. Mel reveals to Benjo that garlic is the only weapon to repel aswangs.

During the full moon, Cecil transforms into her aswang form, killing the house helper and the family driver. Benjo takes his sister with him to run outside their house. Grace arrives with teacher Mel before Cecil could catch the siblings. Recalling Mel's advice, Benjo fought the evil creature and thrusts garlic to Cecil's mouth, killing her instantly.

"LRT"
Thirteen commuters take the last trip of the Manila Light Rail Transit System Line 2 at nearly midnight after hours of work from Katipunan to Santolan, supposedly. While on board the train in midnight, Jean (Manilyn Reynes) met her long lost boyfriend Cesar (Keempee de Leon), who according to him, they last saw each other since they were college. Jean introduced her son, Jimmy (Quintin Alianza). During their conversation, a female deacon named Lita (Eugene Domingo) preaches verses from the Bible, annoying some passengers.

The train travels into an abandoned station which the passengers thought that this was the final stop.  Exploring the station, they find out that everything was shut down and the gates were closed locked. After several minutes of annoyance, the passengers decided to find a telephone booth to call for help. Actually, it was because while between Katipunan and Santolan, the train suddenly shook and went backward to the spur to Santolan Depot Workshops. They passed by some train cars in 2000 series under repair.

As they find a telephone, Martin is pulled up the balcony. The group finds his corpse and his heart pulled out. Unknown to them, a human heart-eating eyeless, strong-sensed and vigilant monster lurks the station every midnight. Lita also falls victim same creature. Ojie (IC Mendoza), sees the corpse of Lita and was killed.

The evil creature suddenly appears, killing more passengers until Steph, Don, Nina, Jimmy, Jean and Cesar are the only ones left alive. As they were trying to escape from the monster by closing the doors, one of them got eaten. Another passenger, Rico (Mico Palanca) was killed. The female passenger, Jenny (Ehra Madrigal) was captured and also killed when they ran. Nina was separated from the members. Nina (Empress Schuck) and her boyfriend Rocky (Dino Imperial) wandered in an old train and discover numerous dead bodies. Apparently, these were the bodies of the passengers who also took the previous last trips of the LRT. The monster appears behind Rocky and kills him while Nina escapes. Steph (Cass Ponti) and Don (Charles Christianson) escaped the train after their friends Jenny and Rico were killed by the monster.

Steph and Don met with Jimmy, Jean and Caesar who were losing contact in the phone. The two friends went out to find an exit but they are again confronted and killed by the monster. After several desperate tries of finding an emergency exit, the remaining survivors Jean, Cesar and Jimmy, found an emergency exit. Shortly after climbing down from the station tower, Cesar pledges his still-living love for Jean. He urged Jimmy and Jean to run while he wards the monster off. After a long fight, Cesar was killed.

As Jean and Jimmy ran, they found a police and tell everything what happened to the train station. Nina, Jean, and Jimmy alert nearby patrolling officers of the Philippine National Police about the incident. The terrible truth was unveiled. The monster is the mutant son of their chief, and that the passengers on the last train every night are being set up to be the food of the monster, with any survivors being killed off by the police. Then, the film ends with the monster growling while Nina, Jean and Jimmy scream and the janitors are cleaning up the mess of blood stains, fixing broken window glass, etc.

Cast

13th Floor
Keanna Reeves as Marge
Bearwin Meily as Sonny
Roxanne Guinoo (formerly Nadine Samonte) as Alyson
Joseph Bitangcol as Gino
Janus Del Prado as Jun
Robert Seña as Oscar
Isay Alvares as Diana
Krystal Reyes as Alex
Aaron Junatas as Ghost Kid

Yaya
Iza Calzado as Cecille
Sheryl Cruz as Grace
Nash Aguas as Benjo
TJ Trinidad as Teacher Mel
Debraliz Valasote as Manang Hermie
Boom Labrusca as Julio
Nene Tamayo as Arlyn

LRT
Manilyn Reynes as Jean
Keempee de Leon as Cesar
Quintin Alianza as Jimmy
Empress Schuck as Nina
Dino Imperial as Rocky
Cass Ponti as Steph
Charles Christianson as Don
Sergio Garcia as Anton
Mhyco Aquino as Martin
IC Mendoza as Ojie
Miko Palanca† as Rico
Ehra Madrigal as Jenny
Eugene Domingo as Lita
TJ Trinidad as Teacher Mel (cameo appearance, crossover from "Yaya")
Boom Labrusca as Monster
Mario Lipit as Monster 2

Accolades

See also
Shake, Rattle & Roll (film series)
List of ghost films

References

External links

2006 horror films
2006 films
Philippine horror films
2000s Tagalog-language films
Regal Entertainment films
2000s English-language films
Films directed by Mike Tuviera